Parapercis flavolineata, the yellowline sandperch, is a fish species in the sandperch family, Pinguipedidae. It is found in Indonesia.

References

Pinguipedidae
Taxa named by John Ernest Randall
Fish described in 2008